John Devereaux Thompson, R.N., M.S. (6 August 1917 – 13 August 1992) was a nurse and professor at the Yale School of Public Health who co-invented the diagnosis-related groups (DRGs) that provided a basis for changing the system for hospital payment.

The Yale School of Public Health currently awards an annual health management and policy research grant to top Graduate students in Public Health under the name, and recognition of, John D. Thompson.

References

External links
 
 John Devereaux Thompson Papers (MS 1498). Manuscripts and Archives, Yale University Library.

1917 births
1992 deaths
American nurses
Yale School of Medicine alumni
Male nurses
Nursing educators
Yale University faculty
Nursing researchers